Born in Machida, Tokyo in 1936. Nakazato attended Tama Art University and continued his art studies at the University of Wisconsin and the University of Pennsylvania. He received the John. D. Rockefeller III Fund Grant and lived in New York City from 1966 to 1967. After returning to Tokyo in 1968, he taught at Tama Art University. Nakazato left Tama Art University in the wake of the student uprising and returned to the United States. He lived in Manhattan until his death on July 17, 2010.

Nakazato had his first solo exhibition in Tokyo at the Pinar Gallery in 1970. He painted a 5 meter x 25 meter mural at the Furukawa Pavilion at 1970 World Exposition in Osaka. In 1971, he was selected for the Japan Art Festival Exhibition at the Guggenheim Museum in New York. He held six solo exhibitions at Tokyo Gallery through his connection with Yoshishige Saito. In 1987, he had a solo museum exhibitions at the Hara Museum of Contemporary in Tokyo. In 2010, the Machida City Museum of Graphic Arts held a large scale solo exhibition.

Formative Years 
Nakazato grew up in post-World War II Japan. His mother came from a family that owned an indigo dying shop. The formative childhood memories of rows of dyed fabrics hanging to dry influenced his later works. He graduated from J.F. Oberlin Jr. Highschool and Oberlin Highschool. He then graduated at Tama Art University in Tokyo, majoring in Western Painting in 1960; there he studied under Shosuke Osawa. 

Upon graduating he worked in Hokkaido for the Hokkaido Times for half a year as an art journalist and then returned to J. F. Oberlin to teach art. After teaching for two years, he went to the University of Wisconsin and graduated in 1966 with an MS in painting and print making. He got his MFA from the University of Pennsylvania, the Graduate School of Fine Art, where he studied with Piero Dorazio and Neil Welliver.

Nakazato received the John D. Rockefeller III Foundation Grant in 1966. He lived and worked in New York City for the next two years. He returned to Japan to become a professor at the Tama Art University and assist in Komai Tetsuro’s print making classes. At the time the Tama Art University faculty included, Yoshishige Saito, Jiro Takamatsu, Tono Yoshiaki, Lee U-Fan, Nakahara Yusuke, and Haryu Ichiro.

Exhibitions 
His works have been included in various group exhibitions and has held numerous solo exhibitions. The following are a few examples. His first solo exhibition was held at St. James Gallery in Milwaukee in 1966. In 1970, Nakazato has his first solo exhibition in Japan at the Pinar Gallery in Akasaka Tokyo. He received a award from the Japanese Minister of Education for a work he contributed to The 5th Japan Art Festival Domestic Exhibition. In the same year, works were exhibited in a group show at the Yokohama Civic Art Gallery, the Guggenheim Museum, and Philadelphia Civic Center. The next year his works are included in a group exhibition at the Tokyo Metropolitan Art Museum. He had solo exhibitions at Tokyo Gallery in 1977, 1979, 1982, 1989, 1993, and 1997. Hara Museum of Contemporary Art, Tokyo in 1987. 1999 International Invitational Works on Paper Exhibition at the University of Hawaii.  The Arthur Ross Gallery at the University of Pennsylvania in 2007. He had a large-scale retrospective solo exhibition at the Machida City Museum of Graphic Arts in 2010.  

Permanent collections

Museum of Modern Art, New York

Pennsylvania Academy of Fine Art, Philadelphia

RISD Museum

Museum of Modern Art, Kyoto

Hyogo Museum of Modern Art, Kobe

Brooklyn Museum of Art, New York

The National Museum of Art, Osaka

Museum of Contemporary Art, Tokyo

The Museum of Modern Art, Kamakura & Hayama

Shizuoka Prefectural Museum of Art

Setagaya Art Museum

The Museum of Modern Art, Wakayama

Birmingham Museum of Art

References 

1936 births
2010 deaths